Matandu River is located in northern Lindi Region, Tanzania.

References

Rivers of Lindi Region
Rivers of Tanzania